Nyassamyia is a genus of flies in the family Stratiomyidae.

Species
Nyassamyia andreniformis (Lindner, 1935)
Nyassamyia deceptor (Curran, 1928)

References

Stratiomyidae
Brachycera genera
Taxa named by Erwin Lindner
Diptera of Africa